Kilmarnock is a burgh in East Ayrshire, Scotland.

Kilmarnock may also refer to:

Objects
 Kilmarnock volume, the first edition of poet Robert Burns' work
 Kilmarnock bonnet obsolete name for Balmoral bonnet or pillbox hat

Peerage
 Baron Kilmarnock, a title in the Peerage of the United Kingdom
 Earl of Kilmarnock, a title in the Peerage of the United Kingdom

Places
 Kilmarnock, a community in Montague, Ontario, Canada
 Kilmarnock, Virginia, a town in Lancaster County, Virginia, United States
 Kilmarnock Academy, a comprehensive school in Kilmarnock, Scotland
 Kilmarnock (HM Prison), a prison near Kilmarnock, Scotland
 Kilmarnock railway station, a railway station in Kilmarnock, Scotland

Politics
 Kilmarnock (UK Parliament constituency), a constituency of the UK House of Commons from 1918 to 1983
 Kilmarnock Burghs (UK Parliament constituency), a constituency of the UK House of Commons from 1832 to 1918
 Kilmarnock and Loudoun (UK Parliament constituency), a constituency of the UK House of Commons
 Kilmarnock and Loudoun (Scottish Parliament constituency), a constituency of the Scottish Parliament

Sport
 F.C. Kilmarnock Ladies, a Scottish women's football club
 Kilmarnock F.C., a Scottish football club
 Kilmarnock RFC, a Scottish rugby union club
 Kilmarnock (Barassie) Golf Club, a Scottish golf club